Black Hill Heath is a 69.67 hectare biological Site of Special Scientific Interest in Dorset, notified in 1989.

Sources

 English Nature citation sheet for the site (accessed 8 September 2006)

External links
 English Nature website (SSSI information)

Sites of Special Scientific Interest in Dorset
Sites of Special Scientific Interest notified in 1989
Heaths of the United Kingdom